Francis Chetcuti (born 21 October 1943) is a Maltese sports shooter. He competed at the 1980 Summer Olympics and the 1984 Summer Olympics.

References

External links
 

1943 births
Living people
Maltese male sport shooters
Olympic shooters of Malta
Shooters at the 1980 Summer Olympics
Shooters at the 1984 Summer Olympics
Place of birth missing (living people)